The Guariba Extractive Reserve is an extractive reserve in the state of Amazonas, Brazil.

Location

The Guariba Extractive Reserve is divided between the municipalities of Novo Aripuanã (28.31%) and Apuí (71.69%) in the state of Amazonas.
The reserve's southern boundary is the border with the state of Mato Grosso. 
It adjoins the Guariba-Roosevelt Extractive Reserve in Mato Grosso.
To the west to adjoins the Guariba State Park and the Manicoré State Forest.
To the north it adjoins the Campos Amazônicos National Park.
To the east it adjoins the Aripuanã State Forest.
The Guariba River, a tributary of the Aripuanã River, runs through the reserve from south to north.

The accumulated deforestation by 2010 totalled , or 0.07% of the total area.
No deforestation was detected in the five years from creation of the reserve in 2005.

History

The Guariba Extractive Reserve was created by Amazonas state governor decree 25.040 of 2 June 2005.
The conservation unit is supported by the Amazon Region Protected Areas Program.

The Apuí Mosaic was created by decree 55 of 12 March 2010 under the responsibility of CEUC in the border region between the states of Amazonas, Mato Grosso and Pará.
The mosaic contains the Guariba and Sucunduri State Parks; Bararati and Aripuanã sustainable development reserves; Guariba Extractive Reserve; and Sucunduri, Aripuanã, Apuí and Manicoré state forests.
The Southern Amazon Mosaic of conservation units in the region between the states of Amazonas, Mato Grosso and Rondônia was recognised by the federal environment ministry by ordnance 332 of 25 August 2011.
It includes the Guariba Extractive Reserve and other units of the Apuí Mosaic

Notes

Sources

2005 establishments in Brazil
Extractive reserves of Brazil
Protected areas of Amazonas (Brazilian state)